The Embassy of Iran in Tokyo is the highest diplomatic representation of the Islamic Republic of Iran in Japan. Since February 26, 2022, Mohammad Reza Loghmani has been the Chargés d'affaires ad interim.

Location

The embassy is located in the Minato Area, Tokyo. The postal address is as follows:

3-13-9 Minami-Azabu Minato-Ku, Tokyo 106-0047

History
In July 1930, the Imperial Legation of Iran in Tokyo was initially opened, but the diplomatic relations between Iran and Japan and the exchange of envoys extraordinary and minister plenipotentiary were suspended during the Second World War. After the war they were all resumed, and in February 1955, the Iranian highest mission in Tokyo was promoted from legation to embassy. In February 1979, the Iranian monarchy was collapsed by the revolution; nevertheless, the diplomatic relations with Japan have been inherited and the Embassy of Iran in Tokyo has continued to this day without any suspension.

See also
 List of ambassadors of Iran to Japan
 Iran–Japan relations

References

External links

 

Tokyo
Iran
Ambassadors of Iran to Japan
Iran–Japan relations
Buildings and structures in Minato, Tokyo
Akasaka, Tokyo